Wholesome Wave is a U.S. nonprofit organization that creates partnership-based programs that enable underserved consumers to make healthier food choices by increasing affordable access to health, locally and regionally grown foods. The organization addresses complex problems through simple solutions with a vision towards healthy, affordable food for all. Wholesome Wave operates two nutrition incentive programs, the Double Value Coupon Program and the Fruit & Vegetable Prescription Program, which tackle the issue of affordability for underserved consumers. Accessibility is emphasized through their supply chain work with food hubs, retail outlets and convenience stores. Wholesome Wave's innovative programs address the complex issues of food insecurity, farm viability, economic vitality of local communities, and diet-related diseases. Wholesome Wave was founded in 2007 by Michael Batterberry, Gus Schumacher and Michel Nischan.

The Obama administration named Wholesome Wave as one of five major strategy groups making a difference in the fight against childhood obesity in its "White House Task Force on Childhood Obesity Report to the President"  and Guidestar's Philanthropedia named Wholesome Wave one of 18 outstanding nonprofits combatting childhood obesity.

Wholesome Wave Programs
Wholesome Wave programs increase access to affordable, healthy, locally grown fruits and vegetables for underserved consumers. Wholesome Wave programs work with community-based organizations in 27 states and D.C.

Double Value Coupon Program (DVCP)
Wholesome Wave's hallmark initiative is the Double Value Coupon Program (DVCP). DVCP is a national network of nutrition incentive programs that operate at farmers markets in 25 states and D.C. These programs allow federal benefit consumers—those who receive SNAP (formerly known as food stamps), Women, Infant & Children (WIC) vouchers, and Senior Farmers Market Nutrition Program (FMNP) vouchers, to receive a monetary incentive when they spend their benefits at farmers markets on locally grown produce. Consumers increase their purchase and consumption of healthy foods, farmers see increased revenue, and dollars stay within the local economy. This program was initiated in 2008 at 12 farmers' markets in California, Connecticut and Massachusetts.

DVCP History
In 2007, Gus Schumacher and John Hyde raised money to double the value of food stamps, WIC vouchers, and benefits for seniors. Schumacher, Wholesome Wave's co-founder, approached the National Watermelon Association for $5,000 to run a program at Crossroads Farmers Market. Simultaneously, Schumacher and Michel Nischan founded Wholesome Wave.

The Double Value Coupon Program was launched in 2008 at the Westport, CT farmers market with seed money for the pilot program from the Betsy and Jesse Fink Foundation. In 2009, building from successful pilot programs in 2008 and with support from a number of foundations and donors, Wholesome Wave outreach expanded the DVCP program to ten states and the District of Columbia. As of 2014, the program has expanded to include a network of more than 60 partners operating incentives programs at more than 350 markets in 25 states and the District of Columbia. Annually, the programs benefit nearly 40,000 participants and their families. Wholesome Wave partners with over 60 community-based non-profit organizations to bring these DVCP incentives to federal benefit recipients that can be redeemed towards fresh locally grown produce.

DVCP In the News
How Double Bucks for Food Stamps Conquered Capitol Hill

Fruit & Vegetable Prescription Program (FVRx)
The Fruit and Vegetable Prescription Program is an initiative for at-risk consumers to exchange healthcare provider-generated "prescriptions" for local fresh fruit and vegetables at participating farmers' markets.  Designed to measure how increased consumption of fresh produce affects critical obesity indicators, pilot programs launched at community health centers throughout Massachusetts and Maine in 2010.  Healthcare providers work in conjunction with local nonprofits and Wholesome Wave to collect data on patient progress and measure success.

FVRx History
In 2010, Wholesome Wave implemented a feasibility study where a total of 246 participants were served in five New England cities through work with three healthcare partners and a statewide network of farmers markets  during the 2010 farmers' market season. The CAVU foundation, Ceiling and Visibility Unlimited, sponsored the clinics that administer the Fruit & Veggie Prescription Program. The Massachusetts Department of Agriculture as well as Wholesome Wave each contributed $10,000 in seed money to the pilot program.

Wholesome Wave expanded the program during its 2011 pilot season to sites in Massachusetts, Maine, California and Rhode Island. In 2012, the program expanded to include twelve sites in seven states throughout the United States and the District of Columbia.

In July 2013, FVRx launched a four-month-long pilot that brought the program to two New York City Hospitals in Harlem and the Bronx. The pilot was run through partnership with the New York City Health and Hospitals Corporation (HHC) and was funded through a $250,000 grant from the Laurie M. Tisch Illumination Fund as part of their Healthy Food and Community Change initiative. "The Fruit and Vegetable Prescription Program — FVRx — turns local farmers markets into pharmacies," says the Wall Street Journal. "Patients receive $2 of 'Health Bucks' coupons for each member of the family, and the coupons can be used to buy fresh produce once a week. Health Bucks are redeemable at any of the city's 142 farmers markets." In 2014, the FVRx NYC HHC Pilot expanded to three hospitals in the city. The New York Times lauds the program as a "win-win endeavor."

FVRx Process
For a patient and their children to participate in the program, they are enrolled by their primary care provider who then introduces them to a nutritionist. The nutritionist will then meet with the participants each month to establish a plan that will reinforce healthy eating habits within the family. After their level of need is established based on consumption habits and Body Mass Index (BMI), the family's health care provider will then distribute prescriptions of a specified number of servings of fruits and vegetables per day. These prescriptions can then be redeemed at participating farmers' markets. These prescriptions can be redeemed weekly throughout participation in the 4- to 6-month-long program and are refilled monthly by the health care provider who will set new goals for healthy eating.

Healthy Food Commerce Investments (HFCI)
Healthy Food Commerce Investments (HFCI) helps to direct capital towards the development of regional food infrastructure by facilitating investments in local "food hubs." The initiative was started in 2011 as a way to encourage reform of food distribution within local food systems.

HFCI History
In 2011, Wholesome Wave launched HFCI to help direct capital into a variety of different projects that build infrastructure for local food systems in a way that promotes regional economy but also serves a wide variety of institutions, small farmers, and distribution centers. In 2013, HFCI successfully helped to facilitate the expansion and development of three distributions centers spanning the East Coast - Farm Fresh Rhode Island, Red's Best, and Dorchester-Pearl.

References

External links 
 Wholesome Wave Organization
 Double Value Coupon Program
 Fruits and Veggies Prescription Program
 Healthy Food Commerce Investments
 Innovations Lab
 Doctors Try a New Rx, Urban Farm Online
 Doctors as Farmers: How Food 'Prescriptions' Can Save Our Cities, The Atlantic
 USDA Pilot to Subsidize Fruits and Vegetables, The Washington Post
  Eat an Apple (Doctor's Orders), The New York Times
 Michel Nischan, Chef, Brings Farmers Markets To Families on Food Stamps, The Huffington Post
 White House Task Force on Childhood Obesity Report to the President, 2010, Section IV. Access to Healthy, Affordable Food

Federal assistance in the United States
Food security in the United States